Paşalı or Pashaly may refer to:
Paşalı, Erzurum, Turkey
Birinci Paşalı, Azerbaijan
İkinci Paşalı, Azerbaijan
Pashaly Treti, Azerbaijan
Navahı, Azerbaijan